Litaneutria obscura, commonly known as the obscure ground mantis, is a species of praying mantis in North America.

It is native to Arizona, southern California, Texas, and New Mexico.

References

obscura
Insects of the United States
Mantodea of North America
Fauna of the Southwestern United States
Fauna of the Chihuahuan Desert
Fauna of the Sonoran Desert
Fauna of California
Natural history of Arizona
Natural history of New Mexico
Natural history of Texas
Insects described in 1872